Anthene lutzi is a butterfly in the family Lycaenidae. It is found in the Democratic Republic of the Congo (Uele, Ituri, Equateur, Sankuru, Kabinda and Lualaba).

References

Butterflies described in 1920
Anthene
Endemic fauna of the Democratic Republic of the Congo
Butterflies of Africa